GiGi Erneta, an American actress, talk show host and writer known for her starring role in the award-winning film Flag of My Father, as Captain Judith Rainier.

Early life and education 
was born in New York City, to Argentinian parents. She studied in the Royal Academy of Dance, Playhouse West, and the Second City Los Angeles.

Career 
GiGi is also known for her roles in When The Bough Breaks, Happy Death Day and Happy Death Day 2U. She also has had recurring roles on Veep, The First, Veronica Mars, Spanish soap operas and guest roles on Nashville, Jane the Virgin, American Crime, Scandal, NCIS: New Orleans, Friday Night Lights, Strong Medicine, and many others network shows.

Erneta is also a contributor to Fox News Latino.

Filmography

Film

Television

References 

American television actresses
Living people
American film actresses
Actresses from Hollywood, Los Angeles
American Protestants
American people of Argentine descent
Hispanic and Latino American actresses
Year of birth missing (living people)
21st-century American women